Darwin L. Jones (born April 4, 1992) is an American soccer player.

Career

Youth, College and Amateur
Jones spent his youth career with Washington Premier FC and the Seattle Sounders FC Academy before beginning his college career at Highline College.  In his only season with the Thunderbirds, Jones tallied 15 goals and 10 assists and led the team to the semifinals of the NWAC.

On February 6, 2012, it was announced that Jones transferred to the University of Washington.  However, on August 26, it was reported that Jones did not meet the state of Washington's Direct Transfer Agreement and would not play for the Huskies in 2012.  He would join the Huskies in 2013 and in his two seasons with the team, he made a total of 37 appearances and tallied 15 goals and nine assists and helped lead the Huskies to a Pac-12 title in 2013.  He was also named First Team All-Pac-12 in back to back seasons.

Jones also played in the Premier Development League for Seattle Sounders FC U-23.

Professional
On January 9, 2015, Jones signed a homegrown player contract with Seattle Sounders FC, making him the fifth homegrown signing in club history.  On March 21, he made his professional debut for USL affiliate club Seattle Sounders FC 2 in a 4–2 victory over defending USL champion Sacramento Republic FC.  He made his first professional start the following week and netted his first career hat-trick in a 4–0 victory over Whitecaps FC 2. Jones made his MLS debut on May 16 against Vancouver Whitecaps FC.

In April 2018, Jones moved to IFK Värnamo in Superettan.

In July 2018, Jones joined Orange County SC in USL Championship.

References

External links

Washington Huskies bio

USSF Development Academy bio

1992 births
Living people
American soccer players
Washington Huskies men's soccer players
Homegrown Players (MLS)
Seattle Sounders FC U-23 players
Seattle Sounders FC players
Tacoma Defiance players
Tampa Bay Rowdies players
IFK Värnamo players
Junior college men's soccer players in the United States
Orange County SC players
Superettan players
Association football forwards
Soccer players from Washington (state)
USL League Two players
Major League Soccer players
USL Championship players
People from Des Moines, Washington
Sportspeople from King County, Washington